Massimo Montanari, currently Professor of Medieval History at Bologna University, is a scholar in Food studies. His interest in the subject stems from his researches and studies in Medieval Agrarian History. He has been invited as visiting professor to a number of leading universities in Europe, Japan, the United States, Mexico and Canada.

He has been one of the founders and editor of the international review Food & History, published by the Institut Européen d’Histoire et des Cultures de l’Alimentation, is member of a number of scientific societies and plays an important role in disseminating topics of his interest to the general public.

Works 

 
 
 
 
 
 
 
 
 
 
 
 
Imola, il comune, le piazze con Tiziana Lazzari (a cura di) (La Mandragora 2003)
Storia medievale, con Giuseppe Albertoni, Tiziana Lazzari e Giuliano Milani (Laterza 2002)
 
Il mondo in cucina. Storia, identità, scambi, (a cura di) (Laterza 2002)
Medievistica italiana e storia agraria. Risultati e prospettive di una stagione storiografica. (Atti del convegno di Montalcino, 12-14 dicembre 1997), con Alfio Cortonesi (a cura di) (CLUEB 2001)
Per Vito Fumagalli. Terra, uomini, istituzioni medievali, con Augusto Vasina (a cura di)(CLUEB 2000)
Storia dell'Emilia-Romagna, con Maurizio Ridolfi e Renato Zangheri (a cura di) (Laterza 1999)

 

 
Il pentolino magico (Laterza 1995)

Il bosco nel Medioevo, con Bruno Andreolli (a cura di) (CLUEB 1995)
Contadini di Romagna nel medioevo (CLUEB 1994)
La fame e l'abbondanza. Storia dell'alimentazione in Europa [The Culture of Food, transl. Carl Ipsen] (Laterza 1993)
 
Convivio oggi. Storia e cultura dei piaceri della tavola nell'età contemporanea (Laterza 1992)
Nuovo convivio. Storia e cultura dei piaceri della tavola nell'età moderna (Laterza 1991)
Convivio: Storia e cultura dei piaceri della tavola dall'antichità al Medioevo (Laterza 1989)
Alimentazione e cultura nel Medioevo (Laterza 1988)
Contadini e città tra "Longobardia" e "Romania" (Salimbeni 1988)
Le campagne italiane prima e dopo il mille. Una società in trasformazione, con Bruno Andreolli e Vito Fumagalli (a cura di) (CLUEB 1985)
Campagne medievali. Strutture produttive, rapporti di lavoro, sistemi alimentari (Einaudi 1984)
L'azienda curtense in Italia. Proprietà della terra e lavoro contadino nei secoli VIII-XI, con Bruno Andreolli (CLUEB 1983)
Porci e porcari nel medioevo. Paesaggio. Economia. Alimentazione. Catalogo della mostra, San Marino di Bentivoglio, con Marina Baruzzi (CLUEB 1981)
L'alimentazione contadina nell'alto Medioevo (Liguori 1979)

Appointments and memberships

Former 
2009 - Visiting Professor at the Université de Paris VII, Paris Diderot
2008 - Visiting Professor at four Canadian universities (The University of British Columbia, The University of Guelph, Wilfird Laurier University, The University of Western Ontario)
2007 - Visiting Professor at the Université Libre de Bruxelles (ULB)
2001 - Visiting Professor at four universities in Japan (Tokyo, Kyoto, Osaka, Nagoya)
1993 - Visiting Professor at UCLA
1992 - Visiting Professor at the École des Hautes Études en Sciences Sociales in Paris

Current 
 Director of the International Master "Storia e cultura dell'alimentazione", at the Faculty of Letters and Philosophy of the University of Bologna
 Director of the journal Food & History, published by the Institut Européen d'Histoire et Cultures de l'Alimentation, Tours (France)
 President of the Center for Studies in the History of the Countryside and Rural Work (Centro di studi per la storia delle campagne e del lavoro contadino), Montalcino (Siena)
 President of the scientific committee of Casa Artusi
 President of the evaluation commission for market certification DegustiBo
 Consultant and associate publisher for Laterza
 Member of the editorial boards of journals Quaderni medievali, Rivista di storia dell'agricoltura, Ricerche storiche, Food and Foodways
 Member of the scientific committee of the Institut Européen d'Histoire et Cultures de l'Alimentation - IEHCA
 Member of the scientific committee for l'EXPO 2015 in Milan
 Board member of the Italian Center of Medieval Studies Centro Italiano di Studi sull'Alto Medioevo of Spoleto (Perugia)

References

20th-century Italian historians
Living people
Italian medievalists
Academic staff of the University of Bologna
Year of birth missing (living people)
21st-century Italian historians
Italian food writers